Rokjesdag is a Dutch term, meaning "skirt day".  It is the first sunny day of the year, when women and girls start wearing (short) skirts. A great and beautiful day according to Martin Bril, a Dutch writer and columnist who made the word "rokjesdag" popular in the Netherlands. Thanks to Bril, the word became a household word in the Netherlands.

References

Dutch culture